M. Ramadass (born 11 October 1949) was a member of the 14th Lok Sabha of India. He represented the Pondicherry constituency and is a member of the Pattali Makkal Katchi (PMK) political party led by S. Ramadoss. He lost to Narayanaswamy, in the 15th Lok Sabha election, in the renamed Puducherry constituency

External links
 Official biographical sketch in Parliament of India website

1949 births
Living people
India MPs 2004–2009
Pattali Makkal Katchi politicians
People from Thanjavur district
Lok Sabha members from Puducherry
Puducherry politicians